"School Love" is a song written by Lynsey de Paul and Barry Blue, which was recorded by Blue and released as his third single on Bell Records in 1974. It reached No. 11 on the UK Singles Chart, No. 3 on the Danish charts (his biggest hit there), No. 9 on the Rhodesian charts No. 24 on the Australian GoSet chart  and No. 31 in the Australian Kent Music Report chart, making it Blue's last international hit, although he would go on to have another two UK hit singles later that year. It also reached No. 4 on the Radio Northsea Toppers 20 on 15 March 1974 and No. 5 on the Hessische Rundfunk Hitparade International chart. 

Blue performed the song twice on Top of the Pops, on 7 and 21 March 1974. According to the NME, it was one of the top 150 UK singles of 1974. It was also listed as 84th best single of 1974 in Australia according to Sydney 2SM as listed in Billboard.

Cover versions of the song was released by vocal group The Hiltonaires on their album Made In England 9, and Brazilian artist Paul Lynsey on the album Super Sucessos 74. It was also released as a single by Italian group Moto Perpetuo and this was often played on Italian radio, as well as an album track by another Italian group, La Quinta Faccia, on their self-titled album with Italian lyrics by Capelli.

More recently, Blue's version was one of the tracks on his compilation CD albums, The Singles Collection. and Dancin' (On A Saturday Night)... Best Of. It was also included on the 2000 compilation CD Jackie Love Songs, which made No. 5 on the UK Albums Chart that year. Blue's version of the song was featured in the 2014 film, Northern Soul.

References

1974 songs
Songs written by Lynsey de Paul
Songs written by Barry Blue